Neeraj Roy (born 13 August 1967) is an Indian businessman. He is the managing director and CEO of Hungama Digital Media Entertainment, which owns Hungama.com and Bollywood Hungama, and managing director of ArtistAloud.com. Under his leadership, Hungama today is South Asia's largest digital and mobile entertainment company. He is also the chairman of the Asia board of the Mobile Entertainment Forum. 

He was recently voted amongst the '50 Most influential People in Mobile Entertainment' globally. Roy was also awarded the Sun Microsystems-Economic Times Young Leader award in 2001 and voted as one of 25 young leaders in the new millennium by Business India. He was elected as the president of Indian Chapter of International Advertising Association (IAA) in 2016. He is also a speaker at various international forums and on several domestic and international committees advising on the global mobile entertainment opportunity.

Early life and education
Roy is from Prayagraj in Uttar Pradesh, where his father established the El Chico espresso and snack bar. At the age of eight he was sent boarding school at St. Joseph's College, Allahabad, where he completed his schooling. Later he graduated from Allahabad University where he topped his class He moved to Mumbai in 1988 to take an MBA at Sydenham Institute of Management Studies.SIMSREE. Roy wanted to be an entrepreneur from his early days in business school.

Personal life
He is married to Raunaq Roy.The couple have a daughter, Kyra, and live in Santa Cruz, Mumbai.

References

Sources

External links
Profile at Hungama.org
Neeraj Roy appointed chairman of Asia Board, MEF
Neeraj Roy on mobile entertainment; amateur content vs branded content
Neeraj Roy creating hungama in the Indian gaming space

Businesspeople from Mumbai
1967 births
Living people
Businesspeople from Allahabad
University of Allahabad alumni
Bengali people
Indian Internet celebrities
Indian chief executives